The Kendall tau rank distance is a metric (distance function) that counts the number of pairwise disagreements between two ranking lists. The larger the distance, the more dissimilar the two lists are. Kendall tau distance is also called bubble-sort distance since it is equivalent to the number of swaps that the bubble sort algorithm would take to place one list in the same order as the other list. The Kendall tau distance was created by Maurice Kendall.

Definition

 

where 

Kendall tau distance may also be defined as

 

where

Kendall tau distance can also be defined as the total number of discordant pairs.

Kendall tau distance in Rankings: A permutation (or ranking) is an array of N integers where each of the integers between 0 and N-1 appears exactly once.

The Kendall tau distance between two rankings is the number of pairs that are in different order in the two rankings. For example, the Kendall tau distance between 0 3 1 6 2 5 4 and 1 0 3 6 4 2 5 is four because the pairs 0-1, 3-1, 2-4, 5-4 are in different order in the two rankings, but all other pairs are in the same order.

The triangular inequality fails sometimes also in cases where there are repetitions in the lists. So then we are not dealing with a metric anymore.

Generalised versions of Kendall tau distance have been proposed to give weights to different items and different positions in the ranking.

Comparison to Kendall tau rank correlation coefficient 

The  Kendall tau distance must not be confused with the Kendall tau rank correlation coefficient  used in statistics.

They are related by  ,  

Or simpler by   where  is the normalised distance  see above) 

Still they are fundamentally different concepts.

(The normalised distance is between 0 and 1)

The correlation is between -1 and 1.

The distance between equals is 0, the correlation between equals is 1.

For example comparing the rankings A>B>C>D and A>B>C>D the distance is 0 the correlation is 1.

Comparing the rankings A>B>C>D and D>C>B>A the distance is 6 the correlation is -1

Comparing the rankings A>B>C>D and B>D>A>C the distance is 3 the correlation is 0

Example
Suppose one ranks a group of five people by height and by weight:

Here person A is tallest and third-heaviest, B is the second -tallest and fourth-heaviest and so on.

In order to calculate the Kendall tau distance, pair each person with every other person and count the number of times the values in list 1 are in the opposite order of the values in list 2.

Since there are four pairs whose values are in opposite order, the Kendall tau distance is 4. The normalized Kendall tau distance is

 

A value of 0.4 indicates that 40% of pairs differ in ordering between the two lists.

Computing the Kendall tau distance 

A naive implementation in Python (using NumPy) is:

import numpy as np

def normalised_kendall_tau_distance(values1, values2):
    """Compute the Kendall tau distance."""
    n = len(values1)
    assert len(values2) == n, "Both lists have to be of equal length"
    i, j = np.meshgrid(np.arange(n), np.arange(n))
    a = np.argsort(values1)
    b = np.argsort(values2)
    ndisordered = np.logical_or(np.logical_and(a[i] < a[j], b[i] > b[j]), np.logical_and(a[i] > a[j], b[i] < b[j])).sum()
    return ndisordered / (n * (n - 1))

However, this requires  memory, which is inefficient for large arrays.

Given two rankings , it is possible to rename the items such that . Then, the problem of computing the Kendall tau distance reduces to computing the number of inversions in —the number of index pairs  such that  while . There are several algorithms for calculating this number.
 A simple algorithm based on merge sort requires time .
 A more advanced algorithm requires time .

Here is a basic C implementation.

#include <stdbool.h>

int kendallTau(short x[], short y[], int len) {
    int i, j, v = 0;
    bool a, b;

    for (i = 0; i < len; i++) {
        for (j = i + 1; j < len; j++) {

            a = x[i] < x[j] && y[i] > y[j];
            b = x[i] > x[j] && y[i] < y[j];

            if (a || b)
                v++;

        }
    }

    return abs(v);
}

float normalize(int kt, int len) {
    return kt / (len * (len - 1) / 2.0);
}

See also
 Kendall tau rank correlation coefficient
 Spearman's rank correlation coefficient
 Kemeny–Young maximum-likelihood voting rule

References

External links
 Online software: computes Kendall's tau rank correlation
 QuickVote — A website that calculates the Kendall tau distance between two interactive ranking lists and shows the pairwise disagreements between the lists. 

Covariance and correlation
Statistical distance
Comparison of assessments
Permutations
Distance